Magnesium ozonide is a compound with the formula MgO3. Much like other ozonides, it is only stable at low temperatures. Unlike other ozonide compounds, magnesium ozonide is white rather than the typical red colour.

Preparation 
Magnesium ozonide can be made by passing a dilute mixture of ozone in nitrogen gas and over magnesium at -259 °C.

O3 + Mg -> MgO3

Magnesium bisonozide

Magnesium is also known to form bisozonide complexes, containing Mg(O3)2 complexed with argon or carbon monoxide, in an argon matrix.

References 

Ozonides
Magnesium compounds